The Penal Code (刑法 Keihō) of Japan was passed in 1907 as Law No. 45.  It is one of six Codes that form the foundation of modern Japanese law. The penal code is also called “ordinary criminal law” or “general criminal law” as it relates to general crimes. Criminal law in the practical sense refers not only to the content of the criminal code, but also to all legal norms that specify the requirements for the consequences of a crime and the content of the penalty as a legal effect imposed on a person. It may also include a law regarding security measures, which is a supplementary system.

The legal nature of criminal law 
The criminal law is classified as substantive law as it defines the contents of crimes and penalties and clarifies the conditions under which a country can carry out a punishment. On the other hand, it is mainly the Criminal Procedure Code that stipulates how an investigation/trial should actually be carried out when a crime in the Criminal Code is committed. Furthermore, it is the Criminal Treatment Law that defines the method of actually executing a punishment. These fields of law are collectively referred to as "criminal law," but criminal law is positioned as the central law of criminal law. 

Also, when the legal system is divided into public law and private law, it is understood that it belongs to public law in Japan.

Criminal function 

 Regulatory function

The function that clarifies the evaluation of actions is called the regulatory function. By describing certain acts as crimes, criminalizing those who do such actions by punishing for criminal acts, it helps to keep the general public from committing those acts.

 Protective function (legal protection function)

The function of protecting legal interests and maintaining order in social life by adding sanctions to infringement of certain legal interests (profit that should be protected by law) is called a protective function. Also known as order maintenance function. 

 Guarantee function (human rights guarantee function)

The criminal law stipulates certain acts as crimes, and the punishment for them is specified in advance. General citizens are not punished unless they commit a crime, and criminals are punished only within that range. In this way, the function that guarantees the freedom of the general public and those who commit crimes by limiting the use of the state's punishment right is called a guarantee function. Also called Magna Carta function.

Source of law in the code 

Many parts of the penal code are based on the laws of Germany and France, such as the civil laws of each country. However, it is most influenced by American law due to the occupation after World War II.

Criminal code types

Criminal criminal law 
The criminal penal code refers to the criminal code relating to the punishment of acts that are thought of as morally wrong and are considered punishable. In Japanese law, in addition to the criminal code, explosives control and punishment for violent acts, etc. belong to the criminal penal code.

Administrative criminal law 
In order to achieve the administrative purpose, the criminal law regarding the punishment of acts that violate administrative laws is called the administrative criminal law. Administrative criminal law has weaker moral elements and stronger administrative elements than criminal criminal law. As it covers all areas of administrative regulations such as tax and economic criminal law, its content is also extensive.

See also
Crime in Japan
Criminal justice system of Japan

External links 
 Japanese Law Translation - Penal Code - Japanese Ministry of Justice

1907 in law
Japan
Japanese criminal law